"Long Way Down" is the fifth single by the Goo Goo Dolls from their 1995 breakthrough album, A Boy Named Goo. The song is often overshadowed by the low-key ballad "Name", which launched the band to household names. Although it wasn't as successful as the chart-topping success of "Name" on the rock and pop charts, "Long Way Down" reached No. 7 on the Billboard Mainstream Rock Tracks chart, and No. 25 on the Modern Rock Tracks chart. It didn't make it to Billboard's Mainstream Top 40 chart, although it did reach a peak of #49 on the Radio & Records pop chart for one week on July 26, 1996 before falling off the following week. "Long Way Down" appeared on the soundtrack for the 1996 film Twister, which contributed to the song's success. The band performed the song on the May 22, 1996, episode of Beverly Hills, 90210.

Track listing
"Long Way Down" - 3:28
"Don't Change" (Live)
"Name" (Live)

Germany release
"Long Way Down (Tom Lord-Alge remix)" - 3:31
"Don't Change (Live)" - 3:48
"Name (Live)" - 3:53

Use by other artists
"Long Way Down" was covered by the metalcore band Haste the Day as the final track on their album When Everything Falls, released in 2005 on Solid State Records. In 2009, the rapper Charles Hamilton sampled "Long Way Down" on a song titled "Something" for his mixtape My Brain Is Alive.

Music video 
The official music video for "Long Way Down" shows the three band members playing in a darkened room, with quick and dizzying camera angles.

Chart positions

References

Goo Goo Dolls songs
1996 singles
Songs written by John Rzeznik
Warner Records singles
1996 songs
American pop punk songs